A roundel is a circular disc used as a symbol. The term is used in heraldry, but also commonly used to refer to a type of national insignia used on military aircraft, generally circular in shape and usually comprising concentric rings of different colours. Other symbols also often use round shapes.

Heraldry

In heraldry, a roundel is a circular charge.  Roundels are among the oldest charges used in coats of arms, dating from at least the twelfth century. Roundels in British heraldry have different names depending on their tincture. Thus, while a roundel may be blazoned by its tincture, e.g., a roundel vert (literally "a roundel green"), it is more often described by a single word, in this case pomme (literally "apple", from the French) or, from the same origins, pomeis—as in "Vert; on a cross Or five pomeis".

One special example of a named roundel is the fountain, depicted as a roundel barry wavy argent and azure, that is, containing alternating horizontal wavy bands of blue and silver (or white).

Military aircraft

The French Air Service originated the use of roundels on military aircraft during the First World War. The chosen design was the French national cockade, whose colours are the blue-white-red of the flag of France. Similar national cockades, with different ordering of colours, were designed and adopted as aircraft roundels by their allies, including the British Royal Flying Corps and Royal Naval Air Service, and (in the last few months of the war) the United States Army Air Service. After the First World War, many other air forces adopted roundel insignia, distinguished by different colours or numbers of concentric rings.

The term "roundel" is often used even for those military aircraft insignia that are not round, like the Iron Cross-Balkenkreuz symbol of the Luftwaffe or the red star of the Russian Air Force.

Flags
Among national flags which display a roundel are the flags of Bangladesh, Belize, Brazil, Dominica, Ethiopia, Grenada, India, Japan, Laos, Niger, North Korea, Palau, Paraguay, South Korea, Tunisia, and Uganda.

Flags for British Overseas Territories used a British Blue Ensign defaced with a white roundel displaying the arms or badge of the dependency until 1999. The same pattern is still used for all the states of Australia except Victoria.

In popular culture

 The roundel, especially that used by the Royal Air Force, has been associated with pop art of the 1960s, appearing in paintings by Jasper Johns. It became part of the pop consciousness when British rock group The Who wore RAF roundels (and Union Flags) as part of their stage apparel at the start of their career. Subsequently it came to symbolise Mods and the Mod revival.
 Some of Paul Weller's material involves the use of a roundel in psychedelic colours.
 Ben Harper's album Fight For Your Mind uses roundels from several air forces as graphics in the liner notes.
 In the British television series Doctor Who, the circular decorations on the interior walls of the TARDIS control room are known as roundels.

Examples

Military aircraft roundels

Other roundels
Some corporations and organizations make use of roundels in their branding.

See also

 
 Cockade
 Fin flash
 Goutte

Notes

References

 

Symbols
Circles